The 2001 Bahraini Crown Prince Cup was the 1st edition of the cup tournament in men's football (soccer). It was played by the top 8 teams of the 2000-01 Bahraini Premier League season

Muharraq Club won the knockout competition.

Knockout Bracket

Bahraini Crown Prince Cup seasons
2001 domestic association football cups
2000–01 in Bahraini football